The 1976 Scottish League Cup final was played on 6 November 1976 and was the final of the 31st Scottish League Cup competition. It was contested by Aberdeen and Celtic. Aberdeen won the match 2–1, thanks to goals by Drew Jarvie and Davie Robb.

Match details

External links

 Aberdeen Win the League Cup, 1976
 Soccerbase

1976
Scottish League Cup Final
League Cup Final
Scottish League Cup Final 1976
Scottish League Cup Final 1976
20th century in Glasgow